Orlinek  is a ski jumping hill in Karpacz, Poland.

History 
The first hill in Karpacz (then Krummhübel, German Empire) was opened in 1912. The record was set by Karl-Heinz Breiter in 1938 at  During the WWII the hill was abandoned and destroyed. After the war Karpacz was placed under Polish administration. A second hill was built under the leadership of Stanisław Marusarz. In 1962 Orlinek collapsed during storm. The new one was built in 1978 then modernized in 2000. The current record of  belongs to Adam Małysz.

References

External links 
 Sylwetka skoczni na skisprungschanzen.com

Ski jumping venues in Poland